WML may stand for:

 What's My Line?, a game show
 White matter lesion, a lesion of the white matter
 Wireless Markup Language, markup used for mobile phones with Wireless Application Protocol
 Website Meta Language, Unix software for HTML generation
 Wesnoth Markup Language, a configuration and scripting language for the game The Battle for Wesnoth
 Wiki markup language, one of several Wiki software implementations for text presentation on the World Wide Web

See also